This is an incomplete list of notable restaurants in the Las Vegas Valley. The Las Vegas Valley is a major metropolitan area located in the southern part of the U.S. state of Nevada. The largest urban agglomeration in the state, it is the heart of the Las Vegas–Paradise-Henderson, NV MSA. A number of restaurants in Las Vegas are in casinos or hotels.

Restaurants in the Las Vegas Valley

 The Black Sheep (2017)
 Capriotti's
 Gilley's Saloon (1999)
 Heart Attack Grill (2005)
 Evel Pie (2016)

At Aria Resort and Casino
 
Bardot Brasserie (2015)
Din Tai Fung (2020)
Javier's (2012)
Julian Serrano Tapas (2010)

At Bellagio
 
 Le Cirque 
 Picasso (1998)

At Caesars Palace

 Bacchanal Buffet
 Nobu
 Restaurant Guy Savoy
 Water Grill (2019)

At Cosmopolitan of Las Vegas

Jaleo
Momofuku
STK
Superfrico

At Flamingo Las Vegas

At Harrah's Las Vegas

At MGM Grand Las Vegas

Joël Robuchon
L'Atelier de Joël Robuchon

At Paris

Mon Ami Gabi (2017)

At the Venetian

Bouchon
 Grand Lux Cafe
 Yardbird Southern Table & Bar

Defunct restaurants

 Alex (1998-2011)
 Café Bleu
 Fleur de Lys (–2010)
 The Green Shack (1929-1999)
 Lutèce (1999–)
 N9NE Steakhouse
 Red Square (1999-2019)
 Rumjungle (–2010)
 The Vineyard
 The Venetian

See also
 Lists of restaurants

References

External links
 

 
Las Vegas Valley